2007 saw many sequels and prequels in video games. New intellectual properties included Assassin's Creed, BioShock, Crackdown, Crysis, Mass Effect, Portal, Rock Band, Skate, The Darkness, The Witcher, and Uncharted.

Events

Hardware and software sales

Worldwide
The following are the best-selling games of 2007 in terms of worldwide retail sales. These games sold at least  units worldwide in 2007.

Europe
Based on estimates from Electronic Arts:
Video game console sales of 2007 in Europe

Japan
Based on figures from Enterbrain:
Video game console sales of 2007 in Japan

Best-selling video games of 2007 in Japan

North America
Based on figures from the NPD Group via IGN; the games' publishers are listed in brackets:

Best-selling video games of 2007 in North America (by platform)

United Kingdom
Based on figures from Chart-Track:
Best-selling video games of 2007 in the UK

Best-selling video games of 2007 in the UK (by platform)The games' publishers are listed in brackets:

United States
Based on figures from the NPD Group:
Video game console sales of 2007 in the US

Best-selling video games of 2007 in the US

Best-selling video games of all time in the US (as of September 25, 2007)

Note: This list only includes games that were released after NPD started tracking video game sales data in 1995.

Critically acclaimed titles
Metacritic (MC) and GameRankings (GR) are aggregators of video game journalism reviews.

Business

Game releases

See also
2007 in games

Notes

References

 
Video games by year